Choleesvarar Temple, Mulanur is a Siva temple in Mulanur in Tiruppur district in Tamil Nadu (India).

Vaippu Sthalam
It is one of the shrines of the Vaippu Sthalams sung by Tamil Saivite Nayanar Sundarar.

Presiding deity
The presiding deity is known as Choleesvarar . The Goddess is known as Soundaranayaki.

Other Shrines
Shrines of Vinayaka, Subramania with his consorts Valli and Deivanai, Surya, Bairava and  Nataraja are found in this temple.

References

Hindu temples in Tiruppur district
Shiva temples in Tiruppur district